Kasper Såby Jensen (born 4 February 1974) is a Danish former footballer who is known to have played as a forward for Dragør Boldklub, Fremad Amager, Vanløse and B1908

Career

In 1995, Såby signed for Czech top flight side Slovácko from Dragør in the Danish third division after a trial where he scored 6 goals in 4 friendlies but left due to injury.

References

External links

 

Expatriate footballers in the Czech Republic
Living people
Danish expatriate men's footballers
Danish expatriate sportspeople in the Czech Republic
Association football forwards
1. FC Slovácko players
Czech First League players
Boldklubben 1908 players
Vanløse IF players
Danish men's footballers
1974 births